Second Yadkin County Jail, also known as the Charles Bruce Davis Museum of Art, History, and Science, is a historic jail building located at Yadkinville, Yadkin County, North Carolina.  It was built about 1892, and is a one-story, two room, hip roofed brick building.  It measures 22 feet by 36 feet.  The building housed the county jail until 1928 and converted to apartments.  The property was donated to the Yadkin County Historical Society in 1976, and restored for use as a museum.

It was listed on the National Register of Historic Places in 1988.

References

Jails on the National Register of Historic Places in North Carolina
Government buildings completed in 1892
Buildings and structures in Yadkin County, North Carolina
National Register of Historic Places in Yadkin County, North Carolina
Jails in North Carolina